Megalobrama is a genus of cyprinid fish, consisting of six species native to fresh water in China and eastern Russia.  The name is derived from the Greek word megalos, meaning "great", and the Old French word breme, a type of freshwater fish.

Species 
 Megalobrama amblycephala P. L. Yih, 1955 (Wuchang bream)
 Megalobrama elongata H. J. Huang & W. Zhang, 1986
 Megalobrama mantschuricus (Basilewsky, 1855)
 Megalobrama pellegrini (T. L. Tchang, 1930)
 Megalobrama terminalis (J. Richardson, 1846) (black Amur bream)

References 

 

 
Cultrinae
Taxa named by Benedykt Dybowski
Freshwater fish genera